"Why Don't You Haul Off and Love Me" is a song first recorded in 1949 by Wayne Raney, written by Raney and his musical partner Lonnie Glosson.  Raney had the most successful release of his career, when his version of "Why Don't You Haul Off and Love Me" went to number one on the Country & Western chart.

Cover versions
In 1949 there were three covers of the song:
 Mervin Shiner and Bob Atcher both made the top ten on the Country & Western chart with their versions.
Rhythm and blues singer/saxophonist, Bull Moose Jackson went to number two for two weeks on the Race Records chart with his version.

References
 

 
 

Bull Moose Jackson songs
1949 songs
Songs written by Wayne Raney